Alexandra Barrulas (born July 8, 1982) is a Portuguese professional wrestler better known by her ring name Shanna. She is well known for her work in All Elite Wrestling (AEW), the German Wrestling Federation, Women Superstars Uncensored and on the British independent circuit competing in promotions such as Pro-Wrestling: EVE and Kamikaze Pro.

Professional wrestling career

Total Nonstop Action Wrestling (2014)
In February 2014 Shanna was booked to appear on TNA's Maximum Impact tour of the United Kingdom. In which she wrestled Alpha Female on her first night in a winning effort but then subsequently losing to Gail Kim on her second night.

World Wonder Ring Stardom (2016-2018)
In June 2016 Shanna traveled to Japan for a two-month tour with the all-female promotion Stardom. In her first match of the tour, she defeated Hiromi Mimura. On the second night, she unsuccessfully challenged Io Shirai for the SWA World Championship. Sometime during the tour, she unsuccessfully challenged Mayu Iwatani for the High Speed Championship. On her last night of the tour, she unsuccessfully challenged Toni Storm for the SWA World Championship. On July 16, 2017, Shanna defeated Kris Wolf to become the new High Speed Champion. She lost the title to Mari Apache on August 13.

All Elite Wrestling (2019−2021) 
Shanna made her All Elite Wrestling (AEW) debut on the October 30, 2019 episode of Dynamite, losing to Hikaru Shida. It was later reported that she had signed a three-year contract with AEW. On February 26, 2020 episode of Dynamite, she wrestled in a Four-Way match against Big Swole, Hikaru Shida, and Yuka Sakazaki which was eventually won by Shida. On the December 1, 2020 episode of AEW Dark, Shanna resumed wrestling for AEW following an eight month absence, winning over Tesha Price. On June 1, 2021, it was announced that AEW wasn't renewing Shanna's contract.

Other media
Outside the ring, Shanna spends her down time streaming on Twitch, playing games such as League of Legends, Final Fantasy, and more.

Championships and accomplishments
Association Biterroise de Catch
ABC Women's Championship (2 times, current)
German Wrestling Federation
GSW Ladies Champion (1 time)
Kamikaze Pro
Kamikaze Pro Fighting Females Championship (1 time, inaugural)
Power of Wrestling
POW Ladies Championship (1 time)
Pro-Wrestling: EVE
2013 Queen of the Ring
Southside Wrestling Entertainment 
Queen Of Southside Championship (1 time)
Swiss Championship Wrestling
SCW Ladies Championship (1 time)
Women Superstars Uncensored
2013 International J Cup Winner
World Wonder Ring Stardom
High Speed Championship (1 time)
World Wrestling Professionals
WWP World Ladies Championship (1 time)

 Turkish Power Wrestling 
 Ladies Crown (1 time)

References

External links

1982 births
21st-century professional wrestlers
Living people
Portuguese expatriates in France
Portuguese female professional wrestlers
Sportspeople from Lisbon
Twitch (service) streamers
High Speed Champions